Andy Chung may refer to:

Andy Chung, former member of the band, King Ly Chee
Andy Chung, fictional character in The Last Ship (TV series)